"Grow Old with Me" is one of the final songs written by John Lennon. It was recorded by Lennon as a demo while in Bermuda in 1980, and later appeared on the posthumous album Milk and Honey in 1984. It was also considered as a possible reunion single by his former bandmates during the making of The Beatles Anthology.

Origins and inspiration
The song was inspired from two different sources: from a poem penned by Robert Browning titled "Rabbi ben Ezra" and a song by Lennon's wife Yoko Ono called "Let Me Count the Ways" (which in turn had been inspired from a poem by Elizabeth Barrett Browning).

Lennon and Ono had for some time admired the poetry of Robert and Elizabeth Browning, and the two songs were purposely written with the couple in mind.

Ono woke up one morning in the summer of 1980 with the music of "Let Me Count the Ways" in her head and promptly rang Lennon in Bermuda to play it for him.

Lennon loved the song and Ono then suggested to him that he should write a Robert Browning piece to accompany it. That afternoon, John was watching TV when a film came on which had the poem "Rabbi Ben Ezra" by Robert Browning in it. Inspired by this turn of events, Lennon wrote "Grow Old with Me" as an answer to Ono's song, and rang her back to play it to her over the phone.

In October 2020 it was reported that the baseball film which Lennon had been watching in Bermuda was A Love Affair: The Eleanor and Lou Gehrig Story, about Lou Gehrig, a baseball player who died of a rare nervous system disorder which later came to bear his name in popular media. Kenneth Womack made the discovery "after watching dozens in search of the mysterious film in question, I began to study TV guides from that period. John was a regular subscriber". Upon realising A Love Affair had been screened at the time Lennon was staying in Bermuda, Womack made the connection, concluding: "The mystery, quite suddenly, was solved".

Recording
The two new songs, "Grow Old with Me" and "Let Me Count the Ways" were originally meant for inclusion on the Double Fantasy album. However, Lennon and Ono, working on a tight deadline to get the album finished and released before Christmas, had decided to postpone recording of the song until the following year (1981) for the follow-up album, Milk and Honey. This never happened owing to Lennon's murder in December 1980.

Had the song been fully finished and recorded, Lennon and Ono had envisioned it as a "standard, the kind that they would play in church every time a couple gets married, with horns and other arrangements". A few different home recordings of it were made by Lennon and Ono and one of these versions was released on "Milk and Honey". Recorded in the couple's bedroom on a cassette with a piano and rhythm box, it was the last recording ever made of the song by Lennon.

In 1998, at Ono's request, George Martin created an orchestrated version of the recording, which was released on the John Lennon Anthology box set. This version was later included on the compilations Working Class Hero: The Definitive Lennon and Gimme Some Truth. The Ultimate Mixes.

In 2009, an acoustic version and an alternative piano arrangement came to light and now circulate among Lennon collectors.

Personnel
John Lennon – vocals, piano

John Lennon Anthology version
John Lennon – vocals, piano
George Martin – orchestral arrangement

Reception
Ultimate Classic Rock critic Stephen Lewis rated "Grow Old with Me" as Lennon's 2nd greatest solo love song, calling it "as sparse and soul-baring as anything Lennon had done since 1970's Plastic Ono Band".

Attempted Beatles version
In 1994, Yoko Ono gave Paul McCartney some cassettes containing demo recordings of four of John Lennon's unfinished songs: "Grow Old with Me", "Free as a Bird", "Real Love" and "Now and Then" with "for Paul" written on them in John's handwriting. The three remaining Beatles (Paul McCartney, George Harrison and Ringo Starr) never attempted to work on "Grow Old with Me" in a similar way that they had with the other Beatles "reunion" songs. "Free as a Bird" and "Real Love" were the only ones completed. They did work on "Now and Then" but decided to abandon it because Lennon's original demo required too much work to bring it up to the standard needed for an official release.

Ringo Starr's version
Lennon's bandmate Ringo Starr covered "Grow Old With Me" for his 2019 album What's My Name. Paul McCartney sang background vocals and played bass, and Jack Douglas, who produced Lennon's Double Fantasy and Milk and Honey, arranged strings – including a George Harrison quote. "And the strings that Jack arranged for this track, if you really listen, they do one line from 'Here Comes the Sun'", Starr said. "So in a way, it's the four of us".

 Personnel 
 Ringo Starr – vocals, drums
 Paul McCartney – backing vocals, bass
 Joe Walsh – guitar
 Jim Cox – piano
 Allison Lovejoy – accordion
 Rhea Fowler – violin
 Bianca McClure – violin
 Lauren Baba – violin
 Isaiah Cage – cello
 Jack Douglas – string arrangement

 Production 
 Wesley Seidman – assistant engineer

Other cover versions 
The song has been covered by a few artists over the years.  Mary Chapin Carpenter recorded it in 1995 on the Lennon tribute album Working Class Hero: A Tribute to John Lennon and it went to #17 on the Billboard Adult Contemporary Chart. It was re-released on her 1999 compilation album, Party Doll and Other Favorites.

Glen Campbell recorded it on his 2008 album Meet Glen Campbell and stated in interviews that he received permission directly from Yoko to record it. He stated erroneously that it had never previously been recorded.

See also
 The Beatles Anthology''
 The Beatles bootleg recordings

References

External links
 
 Grow Old With Me Ukulele Chords by John Lennon

John Lennon songs
Songs written by John Lennon
Songs about old age
Songs released posthumously
1984 songs
2008 singles
Glen Campbell songs
Song recordings produced by John Lennon
Song recordings produced by Yoko Ono